Talafha (or Telfah) is an Arabic tribe, originally from Arabian Peninsula. Big group of this tribe moved from their native land because of a tribal conflict to the north and the eastern north of Hejaz and they settled in Jordan and Iraq. Some groups of the Jordanian parts continued traveling furthermore to the north and finally settled in Syria between Homs  and Hamah. Al-Talafha (Telfah) tribe still exist in its original name in Jordan, Syria and Iraq.

Some traces of this tribe stayed in their native land but they were disconnected from the migrant groups and no reconnections have been experienced.

Tribes of Arabia